First Baptist Church is a historic Baptist church located at 309 E. Adams Street in Muncie, Indiana. The Late Gothic Revival building was designed by Samuel Hannaford & Sons and constructed in 1928-1929 by Morrow & Morrow.  It is constructed of Indiana limestone and has a cruciform plan.  It features and engaged five-story tower.

It was added to the National Register of Historic Places in 1988.

References

Baptist churches in Indiana
Churches on the National Register of Historic Places in Indiana
Gothic Revival church buildings in Indiana
Churches completed in 1929
Churches in Delaware County, Indiana
National Register of Historic Places in Muncie, Indiana
Buildings and structures in Muncie, Indiana